Baron Lake may refer to:
Baron Lake (Idaho), a lake in Boise County, Idaho
Little Baron Lake
Upper Baron Lake
Gerard Lake (1744–1808), 1st Baron Lake, British general

Lake
Lake
Lake